Air Commodore John Emilius Fauquier,  (19 March 1909 – 3 April 1981) was a Canadian aviator and Second World War Bomber Command leader. He commanded No. 405 Squadron RCAF and later No. 617 Squadron RAF (the Dambusters) over the course of the war. A bush pilot prior to the war, he joined the Royal Canadian Air Force as a flight instructor in 1939. He then joined 405 Squadron in 1941 and would fly operationally for the rest of the war, taking a drop in rank on one occasion to return to active command. During his three tours of operation he participated in Operation Hydra and dozens of other sorties over Europe.

Early years
Fauquier was born at Ottawa, Ontario on 19 March 1909, educated at Ashbury College and then entered the investment business at Montreal, Quebec where he joined a flying club. After earning his commercial pilot's licence he formed Commercial Airways at Noranda, Quebec and prior to the Second World War had flown some 3,000 hours as pilot in command on bush operations.

Second World War
He joined the Royal Canadian Air Force in 1939 as a flight lieutenant, completed an advanced course and served until mid-1941 as instructor of British Commonwealth Air Training Plan instructors. After a short period in England at a glider and paratrooper training center, he was posted to No. 405 Squadron RCAF. On returning in difficult weather conditions after bombing Berlin with the squadron on the night of 7 November 1941, he was forced to land his aircraft on a non-operational airfield, and as a result was temporarily suspected of being a spy by the Home Guard.

By February 1942, Fauquier had been promoted to acting wing commander and given command of the squadron. He was awarded the Distinguished Flying Cross (DFC) for gallantry. Shortly afterwards he was transferred from operations to the RCAF's Overseas Headquarters for staff duties. He then served a short term with No. 6 Group before once more taking command of No. 405 Squadron in February 1942.

During Operation Hydra in August 1943, a bombing raid on a German military research facility at Peenemünde, he acted as deputy master bomber, making 17 passes over the target. He was awarded the Distinguished Service Order (DSO) in September 1943, in part for his leadership during the raid. Soon after that raid he was promoted to acting group captain of that squadron, which had become a member of No. 8 (Pathfinder) Group.

During January 1944, he flew 38 sorties, completing his second tour of operations with No. 405 Squadron. He was then awarded a Bar to his DSO.

After promotion to acting air commodore—a rank precluded from operational flying—he was Mentioned in Dispatches in December 1944. He then voluntarily reverted to group captain so that he might begin a third tour of operations, this time as commanding officer of No. 617 Squadron RAF (the Dambusters squadron), which he led from December until the end of the war. Under his command the Dambusters conducted raids against submarine pens, viaducts and other targets.

With the end of the war in Europe, he was awarded a second Bar to his DSO for his command of 617 Squadron. Spencer Dunmore, a historian and novelist, remembers Fauquier in his history of Canada's Air Force during World War II:

Post-war
After the war Fauquier returned to private business. He was inducted into Canada's Aviation Hall of Fame in 1974.

On 4 July 1964, Fauquier traveled to Calgary, Alberta with the Minister of Defence Paul Hellyer, to observe the last official RCAF flight of an Avro Lancaster. This Lancaster, KB-976, was captained by F/L Lynn Garrison with F/L Ralph Langemann as his co-pilot. Other crew members were Captain E.J. McGoldrick, F/O Brian B. McKay, and Jimmy Sutherland, a wartime Lancaster flight engineer.

Fauquier died on Friday 3 April 1981.

References

Additional sources
 Copp, J. (1996). No Price Too High. Toronto: McGraw-Hill Ryerson. .
 Dunmore, Spencer [2000] (2001). Above and Beyond. McClellan and Stewart. .
 Lake, Jon (2002). Lancaster Squadrons 1944–1945. Osprey Publishing. .
 Oswald, Mary (1999). They Led the Way: Members of Canada's Aviation Hall of Fame. 
 Wise, S. F. et al. (1980). The Official History of the Royal Canadian Air Force. Canada Department of National Defence. .

External links
 The Bomber Command Museum of Canada – Johnny Fauquier
 Johnny Fauquier at Canada's Aviation Hall of Fame (CAHF).
 Squadron No. 405 at Canadian Wings.

|-

|-

1909 births
1981 deaths
Canadian World War II pilots
Canadian Companions of the Distinguished Service Order
People from Rouyn-Noranda
Recipients of the Distinguished Flying Cross (United Kingdom)
Royal Canadian Air Force officers
Military personnel from Ottawa
Burials at Beechwood Cemetery (Ottawa)